These are the results of the men's sabre team competition in fencing at the 2004 Summer Olympics in Athens.  A total of 31 men from nine nations competed in this event.  Competition took place in the Fencing Hall at the Helliniko Olympic Complex on August 19.

For the first time since 1988, a non-Russian team won gold in the event.

Tournament results
The team competition was a single-elimination tournament among eight teams.  Quarterfinal losers continued to play classification matches to determine final placement from first to eighth.  Each team match consisted of a set of nine individual matches, comprising a full round-robin schedule among the three fencers on each team.

Brackets

Preliminary match
As there were nine teams in the competition, one preliminary match was held to reduce the field to eight teams.  The losing team, Algeria, therefore had a final classification of ninth place in the tournament.

Quarterfinals

Semifinals

Classification matches

Seventh place match

Fifth place match

Bronze medal match

Gold medal match

References

Yahoo! Sports Athens 2004 Summer Olympics Fencing Results

Men's sabre team
Men's events at the 2004 Summer Olympics